Charles Henry "Jack" Blackburn (May 20, 1883 – April 24, 1942) was an American boxer and boxing trainer. Fighting in the first half of his career as a lightweight and later a welterweight, he was known for an exceptional defense and fought many men above his weight class, including six bouts with the great Sam Langford. He fought Joe Gans three times in no-decision bouts, defeating him once according to newspaper accounts and made good showings against Harry Lewis, Philadelphia Jack O'Brien, and Harry Greb. He found most of his fame training 1937 World Heavyweight Champion Joe Louis, but also had a significant role in training 1926 Lightweight Champion Sammy Mandell. He helped to train World Bantamweight Champion Bud Taylor and World Light-Heavyweight Champion John Henry Lewis as well.

Early life and career

Birth in Versailles, Kentucky, May 1883
Blackburn was born the son of a minister on May 20, 1883, in Versailles, Kentucky. At the age of ten he moved to Indiana, where he was raised in Indianapolis and Terra Haute. In one of his earliest bouts, according to the Pittsburgh Courier, he knocked out Eddie Gardner, brother of the better known Oscar, in eleven rounds in 1899. Frank Sutton was his trainer for a large portion of his career after Blackburn came to Pittsburgh to box around 1903. At one time Sutton operated a boxing club on Ross Street in Pittsburgh, though Blackburn did much of his mid-career boxing in Philadelphia.

Blackburn fought 147 recorded professional fights, often against considerably heavier opponents, though many of his fights were never recorded. He fought notable boxing legends Joe Gans, Sam Langford, Philadelphia Jack O'Brien, Panama Joe Gans, and Harry Greb and finished with a final record omitting newspaper decisions of 99-26-19. After retiring from boxing around 1923, he became a trainer, most notably of legendary heavyweight champion Joe Louis.

Bouts with Black Philadelphian boxer Dave Holly
Blackburn met Black Philadelphia boxer Dave Holly on at least five occasions. He first met Holly on May 4, 1903, drawing with him in a newspaper decision at the Sports Club in Philadelphia. Blackburn likely lost to Holly in a close six-round newspaper decision on November 21, 1903, at the National Athletic Club in Philadelphia. On August 26, 1904, three Philadelphia newspapers considered Blackburn the victor over Holly in a close six-round match at the Manhattan Athletic Club in Philadelphia. On January 20, 1905, the two met again in a no-decision bout in Philadelphia.

On January 10, 1906, Blackburn defeated Holly at the National Sporting Club in Wilmington, Delaware, in a close six-round newspaper decision. Blackburn floored Holly with a right to the jaw in the second round, but in the third Holly sent Blackburn to the mat for a count. In the fourth through the sixth, the Pittsburgh Press considered Blackburn to have the advantage, though the fighting was close. On October 11, 1906, the Philadelphia Item considered Blackburn the victor over Holly in a six-round match at the Broadway Athletic Club in Philadelphia.  All of these matches were likely originally no-decision bouts.  Holly was a Black Philadelphian boxer who would meet Sam Langford and Joe Gans on several occasions, including a bout with Joe Gans in a World Lightweight Championship bout on July 23, 1906.

Boxing career highlights

Bouts with World Lightweight Champion Joe Gans

Boxing with a three-inch reach advantage on November 2, 1903, Blackburn impressively defeated the great World Lightweight Champion Joe Gans in a close non-title, six-round newspaper decision at the Washington Sporting Club in Philadelphia, Pennsylvania. Blackburn was actually down in the first round from a short right to the jaw, but fought on gamely. Blackburn scored frequently with straight lefts to Gans, as well as blows to the body. On March 25, 1904, Blackburn lost to Joe Gans in Baltimore, Maryland in a fifteen-round points decision. The Philadelphia Item noted that "Gans won easily". It was Blackburn's first loss by decision, but it was to one of the greatest black lightweights in history.

On December 31, 1903, boxing as a light welterweight at 142, Blackburn lost to 1907 World Welterweight Champion Mike "Twin" Sullivan at the Chelsea Athletic Club in Chelsea, Massachusetts in fifteen rounds in the opinion of most of the Boston newspapers.  The bout was most likely a pre-arranged draw.

On January 8, 1904, Blackburn drew with Black boxer Sam Bolen in a close fifteen-round decision at Shlegel's Hall in Baltimore, Maryland. The Scranton Republican felt strongly that Bolen had the better of the bout in every round but the second, when he was briefly down on the mat. He fought Bolen one other time, in a six-round win by newspaper decision on December 3, 1904, before the National Athletic Club in Philadelphia.

On October 13, 1905, Blackburn fought a fifteen-round pre-arranged draw at the Marlborough Theatre in Marborough, Massachusetts, with Black New York based boxer Larry Temple. A talented adversary, Temple would fight Joe Walcott, Sam Langford, and Harry Lewis in his career.  Blackburn fought Temple on September 4, 1905, in a twelve-round draw in Sharon Pennsylvania, sandwiched between two bouts with Sam Langford.

Boxing later on June 9, 1906, Blackburn lost to Gans in a six-round bout decided in Gans' favor by newspaper decision at the National Athletic Club in Philadelphia, Pennsylvania. The Boston Morning Journal wrote that "Gans showed that he was his opponent's master in every department of the game."

Bouts with future World Colored Middleweight Champion Sam Langford
Blackburn fought the extraordinary Sam Langford a noteworthy six times in his career. On December 23, 1903, perhaps in one of his most memorable fights, Blackburn met Langford for the first time in a twelve-round pre-arranged draw at the Central Athletic Club in Boston, Massachusetts. Three local Boston papers, including the Boston Globe and Herald wrote that Blackburn likely had the better of the bout. On January 11, 1904, Blackburn and Langford fought a six-round draw at the Washington Sporting Club in Philadelphia, Pennsylvania. On September 9, 1904, Blackburn drew with Langford at the Marlborough Opera House in Marlborough, Massachusetts in a fifteen-round points decision. The fight was sensational, and Blackburn may have been outweighed by Langford by well over thirty pounds.

On September 20, 1905, in front of a substantial crowd of 600, at the Lyric Athletic Club in Allentown, Pennsylvania, Blackburn and Langford met in a ten-round draw. The boxing was fierce and drew blood and both boxers had the better of their opponent at times, with Langford finding a way to counter the keen left of Blackburn. In the third round Blackburn was doubled over the ropes by Langford, and may have been out but for the bell.

Gans and Blackburn met earlier on August 18, 1905, in Leiperville, Pennsylvania, in what was considered a great bout, though Blackburn lost in a fifteen-round points decision. Langford would rightfully claim the World Colored Heavyweight Championship when Jack Johnson vacated it in July 1909, and defend it for several fights, though he would be denied a chance at Johnson's new World Heavyweight Title. Langford would take the World Colored Middleweight Championship defeating Young Peter Jackson in a twenty-round bout on November 12, 1907, at the Pacific Athletic Club in Los Angeles.

Wins over Jimmy Gardner, Blink McCloskey, and George Cole 1904–07
On January 2, 1904, Blackburn defeated well known light and welterweight Jimmy Gardner at the Central Athletic Club in Boston, Massachusetts in a twelve-round points decision.

On September 14, 1904, Blackburn defeated prolific Jewish Philadelphian boxer Blink McCloskey in a six-round newspaper decision by the Philadelphia Inquirer and Philadelphia Record. McCloskey was a boxer of considerable ability and usually lost only to boxers of considerable talent.

On June 10, 1905, Blackburn first met Black Philadelphian boxer George Cole in Philadelphia, losing in a six-round newspaper decision of the Philadelphia Item. Cole's win was something of an upset. On January 1, 1907, Blackburn decisively won his first newspaper decision over Cole at the Philadelphia Athletic Club, giving Cole a "bad whipping". On June 7, 1907, at the New Pen Art Club in Philadelphia, Blackburn won again in a six-round newspaper decision over Cole.

Ten bouts with Black boxer George Gunther
On January 3, 1906, Blackburn first met Black boxer George Gunther at New Castle, Pennsylvania in a fifteen-round bout, defeating him in the opinion of several newspapers. On January 31, 1906, Blackburn defeated Gunther by newspaper decision in a ten-round bout in Newcastle, Pennsylvania, though Blackburn was down in both the third and sixth rounds.  Fighting as a 132-pound lightweight, Blackburn was outweighed by ten pounds though having a three-inch height advantage. On February 7 he would defeat Gunther in a six-round newspaper decision in Pittsburgh in the opinion of three Pittsburgh newspapers as well as the smaller Newcastle Herald. He would meet Gunther a total of ten times drawing with him once, and fighting many close bouts in which he was usually the victor in the opinions of most newspapers.

In their December 6, 1907 bout, Blackburn knocked out Gunther in the fifth round at the Industrial Athletic Club in Philadelphia.  After sidestepping a rush by Gunther, Blackburn's knockout blow was the result of a well-timed right on Gunther's jaw.  The fifth saw some heavy blows on both sides. In their April 18, 1907 six round bout at the Broadway Athletic Club in Philadelphia, Blackburn had the better of the close match, in the opinion of the Philadelphia Item but was still battered by the end.  Gunther was dropped for a count of nine in the second, but showed a slight advantage in the remaining rounds and took the lead in the sixth when Blackburn showed fatigue. On May 23, 1907, against at Philadelphia's Broadway Athletic Club, Blackburn fought what the local papers ruled a draw with Gunther, though the Pittsburgh Press felt a hard left hook to Gunther's face in the fourth gave him the advantage in the bout. Gunther would face many great boxers in his career including Sam Langford, Harry Lewis, and George Carpentier in France.

Bouts with Jim Barry, July, September 1907
On July 8, and September 5, 1907, Blackburn won by newspaper decision and then lost on points to talented opponent Jim Barry who outweighed him by about twenty pounds in both matches. The bouts were in Philadelphia, and Bridgeport, Connecticut. In their July bout Barry was down in the middle of the sixth round from a hard blow to the head and the Wilkes-Barre Evening News wrote that Blackburn had the best of every round.  Barry had been a Montana cowboy and would fight some talented heavyweights in his career including Sam Langford, Battling Levinsky, and Billy Miske, though he would die tragically in a shooting after a boxing match in Ancon, Panama in March 1917.

Impressive bout with 1908 World Welterweight Champion Harry Lewis, November 1907

On November 20, 1907, before around 3000 spectators, Blackburn impressively defeated 1908 World Welterweight Champion Harry Lewis, though the six-round, no-decision bout at the National Athletic Club in Philadelphia was decided by newspaper decision of the Philadelphia Item and Philadelphia Record. The bout was a carefully boxed defensive show with neither boxer landing knockout blows. Showing an effective defense against such an exceptional boxer as Lewis was a considerable achievement for Blackburn. Blackburn appeared to land more blows than Lewis in the first two rounds, but was cautious in the third and fourth. He opened up in the fifth and sixth, being urged on by the crowd, and connected with a few powerful rights, particularly one to the ribs of Lewis which caused him to cover up. Characteristic of Blackburn's style, he effectively used his left jab throughout the bout. Blackburn's three inch reach advantage was used to his benefit. The Wilkes-Barre Evening News wrote that "the bout was so palpably one sided, even the most ardent admirers of Lewis were quieted before the third round was over." Each man collected around $1000 from the well attended bout. The New York Age wrote that "Blackburn was a marvel of science, and self-possession, outboxing his opponent at every angle, judging distance better and hitting a harder blow."

Loss to 1905 World Light Heavyweight Champion Philadelphia Jack O'Brien, June 1908
Boxing as a 147-pound welterweight on June 10, 1908, Blackburn was defeated by Philadelphia Jack O'Brien in a six-round bout at the National Athletic Club. O'Brien knocked Blackburn down in the first round and had him groggy in the third, but Blackburn evaded a knockout in the no-decision bout. Blackburn was outweighed in the bout by slightly under twenty-five pounds, though both boxers were near equal in height. Blackburn was very briefly down in the fifth from a slip. The sixth saw many heavy blows landed but neither men down for a count. The bout was fast throughout.<ref>"Jack O'Brien Won From Blackburn", Trenton Evening News", Trenton, New Jersey, pg. 11, 11 June 1908</ref> O'Brien had taken the World Light Heavyweight Championship in December 1905.

On December 10 and 14, 1908, Blackburn met competent Southpaw boxer Jack Robinson at the Broadway and West End Athletic Clubs in Philadelphia, winning in a close newspaper decision on the tenth, and again in a six-round newspaper decision on the fourteenth.

Four bouts with Mike Donovan
Blackburn first defeated Mike Donovan on October 18, 1907, in a six-round bout at Industrial Hall in Philadelphia in the opinion of the Philadelphia Record, though several newspapers considered the close fight a draw. On December 24, 1907, Blackburn defeated Donovan in Reading, Pennsylvania at the Bijou Theatre in a ten-round newspaper decision. On April 21, 1908, Blackburn drew with Donovan in ten rounds at the Abel Opera House in Easton, Pennsylvania. In their November 23, 1908, six round bout, at the opening of Duquesne Gardens as a fight venue in Pittsburgh, The Pittsburgh Post wrote that "from start to finish, Blackburn danced around the Rochester man (Donovan), landing six blows to his opponent's one," and that he used a large repertoire of blows against which Donovan's only effective defense was to clinch.

Trouble with the law, manslaughter conviction, 1909–14
Blackburn fought outside the ring at times, which caused him trouble in his life. He served four years and eight months for manslaughter as the result of a tragic shooting spree he instigated that led to several deaths in Philadelphia in 1909. In 1935, Blackburn was indicted for manslaughter, as a result of two shootings in October of that year, though the charges were later dropped. He was briefly held in jail on October 21, 1935, and probably for a period later in that year.Louis's Trainer Suspected of Shooting Girl", Nevada State Journal, Reno, Nevada, pg. 1, 22 October 1935

Second half of career, and return to boxing after jail sentence
After the completion of his jail sentence, Blackburn usually fought closer to the welterweight and light middleweight divisions, but continued to fight highly skilled opponents. His loss of training and advancing age caused by his sentence affected his boxing somewhat, and he won fewer bouts subsequent to his jail term.

Close loss to heavyweight Gunboat Smith, May 1914
In one of his first bouts after his prison term, fighting as a 150-pound light middleweight, he lost to Gunboat Smith in a six-round newspaper decision in front of 3000 fans at the National Athletic Club in Philadelphia on May 20, 1914. Smith was a 6' 2" heavyweight who outweighed him by thirty pounds. Blackburn was down for a count of nine from a right to the forehead in the first round. Blackburn took another count of nine in the fifth round, but throughout the fight he showed pluck and often was the aggressor. In the fourth and particularly the third rounds, Blackburn kept the boxing close and may have taken the third. Smith would meet Battling Levinsky and Jack Dempsey on several occasions in his career, and was considered one of the top white heavyweight contenders at the time.

Exciting bout with 1923 World Middleweight Champion Harry Greb, January 1915

On January 25, 1915, Blackburn met 1923 World Middleweight Champion Harry Greb at Duquesne Gardens in Pittsburgh, Pennsylvania, losing in a six-round newspaper decision of the Pittsburgh Post. Even against the great competitor Greb who was known to throw an exceptionally large number of punches, the Post wrote that Blackburn "blocked, side-stepped, slipped, rode, and ducked", putting up an excellent defense. The bout was reasonably close with Greb clearly taking around four of the six rounds. Blackburn opened up in the third, sending a stiff left to the jaw of Greb and another to the mouth. Blackburn may have taken the sixth, but Greb's ability to throw far more punches, characteristic of his style, probably helped him to win on points. The Pittsburgh Press noted Blackburn's "eel-like evasions of Greb's short range stuff", and that he "served flashes of former brilliancy", but Greb's youth, stamina, and strength was the final determinant of the fight's outcome.  The Pittsburgh Post wrote that Blackburn was "so elusive that not one punch in ten that Greb started ever connected."

On August 23, 1916, Blackburn defeated Young Ahearn, a noted welter and middleweight based in Brooklyn, at the National Athletic Club in Philadelphia, Pennsylvania in a six-round newspaper decision of Philadelphia's Public Ledger, and Record. Blackburn had a two-inch advantage in height and reach, though Ahearn was six years younger at only twenty-three to Blackburn's thirty-four, an advancing age for a competitive boxer. One month later on August 8, Blackburn and Ahearn would fight a ten-round draw at the Harlem Sports Club in New York City.

On October 20 and November 3, 1916 Blackburn lost twice to powerful hitter Joe Borrell by six-round newspaper decisions at the Nonpareil Athletic Club in Philadelphia. In their October 20 bout, Blackburn staggered Borrell in the first with a right hook to the jaw, making Borrell fight more cautiously. In the sixth and final round, Borrell took the advantage, staggering Blackburn, and showing more aggression. Borrell was ten years younger than Blackburn at only twenty-four. In their November 3, bout, Borrell gave Blackburn a "severe whipping", and never let up on his opponent. Borrell reached both the head and body. In their last bout on June 15, 1917, in a six-round bout at the Cambria Club in Philadelphia, Blackburn defeated Borrell in the opinion of the Philadelphia Record, though the boxing was close.

Late career loss to the future Colored Light Heavyweight Champion Kid Norfolk, June 1920
On June 22, 1920, Blackburn met the great future 1923 Colored Light Heavyweight World Champion Kid Norfolk, originally William Ward, losing in a fourth-round knockout at Madison Athletic Club in Philadelphia, Pennsylvania. Norfolk reportedly had a twenty-pound advantage on Blackburn and was about thirteen years younger, requiring the referee to stop the bout in the fourth round, as Blackburn could do little against his far stronger opponent. A match with such a glaring weight discrepancy would not have been made among more contemporary boxers, though Blackburn had a slight advantage in height and reach.

Loss to Panama Joe Gans, July 1922
Blackburn fought the Barbados-born boxer Panama Joe Gans, who had boxed extensively in Panama where he lived prior to 1917. Panama Joe held the World Colored Middleweight Championship from 1920 to 1924, and held a Panamanian Lightweight Title in his youth. On July 24, 1922, Blackburn lost one of his last bouts to Gans in Indianapolis, Indiana, in a fourth-round technical knockout of a scheduled ten round bout. Panama Joe was a formidable boxer and fourteen years younger than Blackburn when they met, though Blackburn had a three-inch advantage in height and reach. Boxing at forty, Blackburn probably should not have been matched with the twenty-six year old Gans.

On March 7, 1923, Gans fought Ray Pelkey, in what was likely his last recorded bout, at the Auditorium in Oakland, California, losing in a third-round knockout. Blackburn went down to one knee in the third round and remarked to the referee that he lacked the wind to continue. The referee ended the bout as a knockout. Blackburn was boxing at forty to Pelkey's twenty-four years. Eleven years later, Blackburn would begin training Joe Louis.

Sammy Mandell takes World Lightweight Championship, July 1926
On July 3, 1926 Sammy Mandell took the World Lightweight Championship, defeating Rocky Kansas in Chicago. Blackburn had trained Mandell on his punching skills from his earliest start in boxing.

Working as a trainer to Joe Louis, 1934–42
After retiring from boxing around 1923, Blackburn drifted from job to job before Black Chicago businessman, Julian Black chose him to train Joe Louis, who was fresh from his achievements in the Golden Gloves. Blackburn wrote he had trained Louis since June 1934, shortly before Louis's first recorded professional bout, a knockout against Jack Kracken in Chicago. He helped Louis to properly time his blows, improve his punching accuracy, and to focus on proper balance.  Blackburn's greatest achievement as a trainer came on June 22, 1937, when Joe Louis took the World Heavyweight Championship from Jim Braddock at Comiskey Park in Chicago, Illinois in an eighth-round knockout. Blackburn had trouble with drinking in his later years while training Joe Louis that likely caused the deterioration of his health.Julian Black chose him as trainer in "Jack Blackburn's Death Toughtest Blow for Lewis", The News-Herald, Franklin, Pennsylvania, pg. 7, 25 April 1942

List of Blackburn's trainees
In his career, besides his long work with Joe Louis, Blackburn had roles training Light Heavyweight Champion John Henry Lewis, Bantamweight Champion Bud Taylor, as well as Art Lasky, Jackie Fields, Lew Tendler, Sailor Freedman, and Von Porat. He also trained Billy Ryan a welterweight from Cincinnati. While in Philadelphia, Blackburn briefly trained Jersey Joe Walcott.

Early death by heart attack in 1942
He died on April 24, 1942, of a heart attack while he was being given a routine physical examination. He had been suffering from pneumonia for two months, beginning shortly before Joe Louis met Abe Simon at Madison Square Garden in March of that year. Only months before his death, Blackburn was in Louis's corner giving him advice.

Blackburn's death came particularly hard for his greatest training protégé, world heavyweight champion Joe Louis whom he had trained since Louis's first professional bout.  His funeral, which several thousand attended, took place on the South side of Chicago at Pilgrim Baptist Church on April 29, 1942. He was buried at Chicago's Lincoln Cemetery.  Chicago businessman Julian Black, who had helped recruit him as a trainer for Joe Louis, attended, as did Louis's manager Mike Jacobs. He was survived by his widow Laura, a stepson, a brother John, and a sister.

Legacy
He is an inductee of the World Boxing Hall of Fame and was an inductee of the International Boxing Hall of Fame in the non-participant category in 1992.

He appeared as a character in the opera, Shadowboxer, based on the life of Joe Louis. He was portrayed by actor Richard Roundtree in the 2002 film Joe and Max and also by James Edwards in the 1953 movie The Joe Louis Story''.

Professional boxing record
All information in this section is derived from BoxRec, unless otherwise stated.

Official record

All newspaper decisions are officially regarded as “no decision” bouts and are not counted in the win/loss/draw column.

Unofficial record

Record with the inclusion of newspaper decisions in the win/loss/draw column.

References

1883 births
1942 deaths
American male boxers
American boxing trainers
Lightweight boxers
International Boxing Hall of Fame inductees
Joe Louis
Boxers from Kentucky
People from Versailles, Kentucky